The Belgium national football team represents the country of Belgium in international association football. It is fielded by the Royal Belgian Football Association, the governing body of football in Belgium, and competes as a member of the Union of European Football Associations (UEFA), which encompasses the countries of Europe.

This list contains all players with between 5 and 20 appearances for the national team. For a list of players with 21 or more caps, see List of Belgium international footballers, other players are listed at List of Belgium international footballers (1–4 caps).

Players

Appearances and goals are composed of FIFA World Cup and UEFA European Championship matches and each competition's required qualification matches, as well as UEFA Nations League matches and numerous international friendly tournaments and matches. Statistics correct as of 7 August 2018.

References

 
Association football player non-biographical articles